Zambia competed in its ninth Commonwealth Games in Manchester in 2002. It was the third time that the nation had won a gold medal at the games and its most recent success.

Competitors
The following is the list of number of competitors participating at the Games per sport/discipline.

Medal summary

Medal table

|  style="text-align:left; width:78%; vertical-align:top;"|

|  style="text-align:left; width:22%; vertical-align:top;"|

Athletics

Men

Women

Badminton

Zambia participated with two athletes (one men and one women)

Men

Women

Mixed

Boxing

Zambia participated with a team of 5 athletes.

Men

Cycling

Zambia participated with 2 athletes (2 men).

Road
Men

Judo

Men

Lawn bowls

Men

Women

Squash

Singles

Doubles

Swimming 

Three athletes represented Zambia in swimming:

Men

Women

Weightlifting

Men

See also
2002 Commonwealth Games results

References

Zambia at the Commonwealth Games
2002 in Zambian sport
Nations at the 2002 Commonwealth Games